Janice Todd (née Suffolk; born May 22, 1952) is a Professor and Interim Department Chair (starting August, 2022) in the Department of Kinesiology and Health Education at The University of Texas at Austin. Todd is a member of the Sport Management faculty, and teaches classes in sport history, sport philosophy, and sport and ethics. An active lecturer, Todd was named the Seward Staley Honor Lecturer for the North American Society for Sport History in 2008.

Dinnie Stones
Janice Todd is perhaps best known outside the powerlifting community for being the first woman ever to successfully lift the Dinnie Stones in 1979. This feat was not replicated again until 2018, by Leigh Holland-Keen.

Powerlifting career 
Todd’s interest in the study of sport and physical culture was galvanized by her participation and success in the sport of powerlifting. During her powerlifting career, many publications—including Sports Illustrated magazine  – considered her to be the strongest woman in the world. As a powerlifter, Todd set more than 60 national and world records, and was included in the Guinness Book of Records for over a decade. On 2 February 1978 she appeared on The Tonight Show Starring Johnny Carson, performing several lifts along with Johnny Carson. Todd was the first woman inducted into the International Powerlifting Hall of Fame. She was inducted in the first class of the Women’s Powerlifting Hall of Fame, and the 2009 class of the US National Fitness Hall of Fame. She also received the 2008 Oscar Heidenstam Foundation Lifetime Achievement Award for her contributions in the field of physical fitness.

Later years
Todd also serves as co-editor of Iron Game History: The Journal of Physical Culture, a scholarly journal for the history of physical culture. In addition, she has written numerous articles on topics such as sport and exercise history, anabolic steroids, and strength training as well as two books: Physical Culture and the Body Beautiful: Purposive Exercise in the Lives of American Women (Mercer University Press, 1998), and Lift Your Way to Youthful Fitness (Little-Brown, 1985).

With her husband, Terry Todd, Jan Todd founded the H.J. Lutcher Stark Center for Physical Culture and Sports. The Stark Center, which opened in a new facility in the fall of 2009, contains museum exhibits as well as a research library and the largest archive in the world devoted to the study of physical fitness, resistance training, and alternative medicine.

References

External links 
 H.J. Lutcher Stark Center for Physical Culture and Sports 

1952 births
American educators
Living people
People associated with physical culture